James Brown (born 26 June 1989) is a Canadian male  BMX rider, representing his nation at international competitions. He competed in the time trial event at the 2015 UCI BMX World Championships.

References

External links
 
 

1989 births
Living people
BMX riders
Canadian male cyclists
Place of birth missing (living people)